The AIC Serie A Women's Team of the Year (in Italian: Squadra dell’anno AIC femminile) is an annual award given to a set of eleven female footballers in the top tier of Italian women's association football, the Serie A, who are considered to have performed the best during the previous calendar season. It is awarded within the Gran Galà del Calcio event.

Winners
Players in bold also won the Serie A Female Footballer of the Year award.

2018–19

Source:

{| style="width:100%;"
|width="50%"|

2019–20

Source: